Maharam's Synagogue was a synagogue in Lublin, Poland, which was located on a no-longer-existing Jateczna 3 Street. The synagogue was a part of synagogical complex in Podzamcze.

History
Maharam's Synagogue was built near the end of the 16th or in the beginning of the 17th century, as a building clinging to the southern wall of Maharshal's Synagogue. The synagogue was named in honour of Lublin's rector and rabbi, Meir Lublin, who was also referred to as Maharam. The synagogue was purposed for officiating shabbat. The two synagogues could seat 3000 prayers combined.

It is likely that sessions of the Council of Four Lands took place within the synagogue. During Cossack-Muscovite invasion on Lublin in 1655, the aggressors burnt the building down although it was quickly rebuilt. During the subsequent years the building was neglected and not renovated and in 1854, after the night of Yom Kippur, the ceiling gave away. In 1866, a long renovation was finally completed. Of the old building, only the outline of the external wall is left.

During the interwar period due to bad technical condition, an extensive recondition was planned, however, the Second World War broke those plans. During the war, Nazi administration ordered to close the synagogue for worship purposes. Inside, existed a shelter for the poor, refugees, displaced persons. After the disposal of Lublin Ghetto, the synagogue with whole synagogical complex was blown up.

After the war, for a few years the ruins of the building weren't touched. In 1954, on order of the city's administration, they were dismantled because of building a new street, Aleja Tysiąclecia. There's a granite memorial, on which is written an expression in Polish, Yiddish and Hebrew languages.

In 2007, on initiative of Ośrodek Brama Gordzka-Teatr NN, a 3D model of Maharshal's and Maharam's Synagogues was created, after six months of work by Krzysztof Mucha.

Architecture
The brick building was erected on the plan of elongated square in west–east direction in renaissance style. For the entry, one had to use staircase located in the Maharshal's Synagogue.

There is no information on the plan of the building prior to the 1656 fire, besides the outlines on the city plans from: 1783, circa 1800, 1823 and 1829. The outline from 1823 is similar to the 1920 drawing. Until today, at least a dozen photographs, drawing and plans from the interwar period remained, thanks to which both internal and external views of the synagogue are known.

The building was fragmented on two long, narrow and preceded by a vestibule, rooms: a main room for prayers, clinged to the prayers' room in Maharshal's Synagogue and a women's zone from the external side. Both of the rooms had a wooden ceiling.

On the middle of the main room for prayers, a short, 8-sided, 2-entry and surrounded by banister, the bimah. On the Eastern wall, an ark was located, with Decalogue's memorials and covered by a parochet with the Star of David embroidered. Besides, on this wall, a polychrome was painted as well as an unidentified picture.

Notes

Bibliography
Maria and Kazimierz Piechotek – Bramy Nieba. Bóżnice murowane na ziemiach dawnej Rzeczypospolitej (Warsaw 1999) 
Karolina and Symcha Wajs – Fakty i wydarzenia z życia lubelskich Żydów (Lublin 1997) 
Wysok Wiesław, Kuwałek Robert – Lublin. Jerozolima Królestwa Polskiego (Lublin 2001) 
Majer Bałaban – Żydowskie miasto w Lublinie (Lublin 1991)

Synagogues completed in 1866
Buildings and structures in Lublin
Former synagogues in Poland
Orthodox synagogues in Poland
Jews and Judaism in Lublin
19th-century religious buildings and structures in Poland